Mastering the Internet (MTI) is a mass surveillance project led by the British communications intelligence agency Government Communications Headquarters (GCHQ) budgeted at over £1 billion. According to reports in The Register and The Sunday Times in early May 2009, contracts with a total value of £200m had already been awarded to suppliers.

Responding to these reports, GCHQ issued a press release countering these claims of mass surveillance, stating that "GCHQ is not developing technology to enable the monitoring of all internet use and phone calls in Britain, or to target everyone in the UK."

However, the 2013 mass surveillance disclosures revealed that the GCHQ gathers "raw" information (without filtering out the communications of British citizens) from the web as part of its "Mastering the Internet" programme.

Background 
"Mastering the Internet" (MTI) is a project by the British government and part of the Interception Modernisation Programme (IMP). The system was described in 2009 by The Register and The Sunday Times as the replacement for scrapped plans for a single central database. This involves thousands of DPI black boxes at various internet service providers in association with the GCHQ base in Cheltenham, funded out of a Single Intelligence Account budget of £1.6 bn, including a £200m contract with Lockheed Martin and a contract with BAE Systems Detica.

As of 2013, the system is capable of copying signals from up to 200 fibre-optic cables at all physical points of entry into Great Britain.

International cooperation

Canada 

As early as 2007, John Adams, chief of Canada's intelligence agency Communications Security Establishment, told the Parliament of Canada about plans of the "Five Eyes" to master the Internet in cooperation with the NSA and other allies:

United States 

In 2013, The Guardian provided specific details of financial contributions made by the U.S. National Security Agency (NSA) in "Mastering the Internet" as part of the "Five Eyes" alliance between several English-speaking Western democracies. According to documents leaked by Edward Snowden, the NSA paid the GCHQ over £17.2  million towards running the programme.

See also 
 Communications Capabilities Development Programme
 Global Telecoms Exploitation
 Mass surveillance in the United Kingdom
 Tempora

References 

Intelligence agency programmes revealed by Edward Snowden
Surveillance
Civil rights and liberties in the United Kingdom
Mass intelligence-gathering systems
Programmes of the Government of the United Kingdom
Internet security
Home Office (United Kingdom)
GCHQ operations